Avraham "Avi" Cohen (14 November 1956 – 29 December 2010) was an Israeli footballer who played as a defender, and a manager. He was best known for his spells playing for two British clubs: Liverpool in England and Rangers in Scotland. After retirement from active football and management, he was the chairman of the Israel Professional Footballers Association for over five years until he was killed in a motorcycle crash. after his death Maccabi Tel Aviv retired the number 5 that he formerly wore.

Career
Cohen was born in Cairo, Egypt, and was Jewish. He moved to Israel as a youngster, and began his playing career with Maccabi Tel Aviv, before joining Liverpool for a fee of £200,000 ($450,000) in July 1979, and became the first Israeli to play in England. He struggled to establish himself as a regular at Anfield and was released in November 1981, rejoining Maccabi. On 20 September 1980, Cohen stirred up controversy when he decided to play in Liverpool's away fixture versus Southampton, which fell on the Jewish holiday of Yom Kippur. Liverpool drew with Southampton 2–2 in front of 24,085 spectators and Cohen was lambasted by the Israeli media for playing. He returned to the United Kingdom in 1987, when he had a brief spell under former Liverpool teammate Graeme Souness at Rangers, before ending his career with Maccabi Netanya.

He also played for the Israeli national team, making his debut on 19 July 1976 during the 1976 Summer Olympics in a 0–0 draw against Guatemala. On 9 October 1984, Cohen scored his first goal against Greece in a 2–2 friendly draw. He was capped 51 times, scoring 3 goals. His son, Tamir, is also a professional footballer who plays for Maccabi Haifa in the Israeli Premier League and the Israeli national team.

Personal life
Cohen was married to Dorit Cohen and the father of three, including the football player Tamir Cohen. In addition, Cohen was the brother-in-law of former football player Vicky Peretz and the uncle of Peretz sons – Adi and Omer Peretz.

In 2008, he participated in the Israeli reality version of Dancing with the Stars and was the fifth to be eliminated.

Death

On 20 December 2010, Cohen was seriously injured in a motorcycle crash. He was taken to Tel Aviv's Ichilov Hospital, where he was immediately taken into surgery. On 28 December 2010, the hospital declared that Cohen was brain dead. His brain death was confirmed by his son Tamir later the same day. Paying tribute to Cohen, Kenny Dalglish said "Avi was a lovely man who will be remembered fondly by everyone at Liverpool who knew him. He quickly integrated himself into the football club when he joined us and spent a lot of time learning English which really made him popular. He was well liked by all the lads and although he didn't spend a long time at the club, he certainly left his mark and no-one will forget how he helped us win the league against Aston Villa. My thoughts and those of everyone connected to the club are with Avi's family." Ally McCoist said "we knew his situation was bad but never for a second did we think it would come to this" before going on to say it was "so sad to hear that he has passed away."

Liverpool marked the death of Cohen with a period of applause before their Premier League match against Wolverhampton Wanderers on 29 December 2010. The club also played a friendly game against the local Jewish community in honor of Avi. They competed for the Avi Cohen cup. Liverpool Legends team won 1–0.

On 24 April 2011, his son Tamir, of Bolton Wanderers, paid a tribute to his late father after scoring the winner against Arsenal and celebrating with a printed T-shirt with his father's face on it.

Career statistics

International goals

Honours

Player

Club
Maccabi Tel Aviv
Liga Leumit First Division (2): 1976–77, 1978–79
State Cup (2): 1976–77, 1986–87
Israel Super Cup (1): 1988
Liverpool
Football League First Division (1): 1979–80
Charity Shield (2): 1979, 1980
European Cup (1): 1980–81

Rangers
League Cup (1): 1987–88

Individual
Israel Player of the Year (1): 1978–79
Member of the Israeli Football Hall of Fame

See also

List of select Jewish football (association; soccer) players

References

External links
 injurylawguidecalifornia.org Accident Attorneys California
 Thisisanfield.com Forgotten Heroes
Profile at lfchistory.net
RSSSF international career statistics
 European Champions Cup/UEFA Champions League Winning Squads

1956 births
2010 deaths
Israeli Jews
Israeli footballers
Association football fullbacks
Footballers at the 1976 Summer Olympics
Israel international footballers
Israeli expatriate footballers
Israeli football chairmen and investors
Liga Leumit players
Maccabi Tel Aviv F.C. players
Liverpool F.C. players
Rangers F.C. players
Maccabi Netanya F.C. players
Motorcycle road incident deaths
Olympic footballers of Israel
Road incident deaths in Israel
Egyptian emigrants to Israel
Israeli football managers
Beitar Tel Aviv F.C. managers
Maccabi Yavne F.C. managers
Maccabi Ironi Ashdod F.C. managers
Hapoel Kfar Saba F.C. managers
Hapoel Ashkelon F.C. managers
Maccabi Herzliya F.C. managers
Expatriate footballers in England
Expatriate footballers in Scotland
Israeli expatriate sportspeople in England
Israeli expatriate sportspeople in Scotland
Israeli Football Hall of Fame inductees
Israeli Footballer of the Year recipients